The Reckless Rider is a 1932 American western film directed by Armand Schaefer and starring Lane Chandler, Phyllis Barrington and Neal Hart. It was a loose remake of the 1928 FBO Pictures film When the Law Rides also written by Oliver Drake.

Synopsis
'Tex' Wilkins confronts a masked night rider who is threatening the inhabitants of a town.

Cast
 Lane Chandler as 	'Tex' Wilkins
 Phyllis Barrington as Mary Jones
 J. Frank Glendon as Parson Jones
 Neal Hart as John Lamar
 Patrick Rooney as 	'Butch' Harbin 
 G. Raymond Nye as 'Wheezer' Bill
 Bartlett A. Carre as 	Ole 
 Ben Corbett as 	Benny
 Franklyn Farnum as Sheriff
 Arthur Thalasso as Bartender
 Raven the Horse as Raven - Tex's Horse

References

Bibliography
 Pitts, Michael R. Western Movies: A Guide to 5,105 Feature Films. McFarland, 2012.

External links
 

1932 films
1932 Western (genre) films
American black-and-white films
American Western (genre) films
Films directed by Armand Schaefer
1930s English-language films
1930s American films